The Cadillac Model Thirty is an automobile that was introduced in December 1909 by the Cadillac Division of General Motors, and sold through 1911.  It was the company's only model for those years and was based on the 1907 Model G.  The 1912 Model 1912, 1913 Model 1913, and 1914 Model 1914 were similar but used larger engines. This platform only used a four-cylinder engine which was permanently cancelled in 1914, as other GM brands would take on the task of offering a less prestigious engine. The 1912 Model 30 was the first production car to have an electric starter (as do all modern cars) rather than a hand crank or spring or other early method.

Engine and bodies
The 1910 model was available with a closed body, the first time a US automobile manufacturer had offered this type.

The engine was the same 226.2 in³ (3.7 L) four-cylinder L-head design used in the Model G, and that car's simple sliding-gear transmission was also adopted.  The engine was bored out to 255.4 in³ (4.2 L) for 1910 and 286.3 in³ (4.7 L) for 1911 and 1912.   The engine was reworked, with a longer stroke, for 1913, giving 365.8 in³ (6.0 L) of displacement.  This same engine served in 1914. It was replaced by the Cadillac Type 51, Cadillac's first V8 vehicle.

Self starter
The 1912 model was awarded the Dewar Trophy for its electrical system, including its electric starter.

See also
List of Cadillac vehicles#Early Antique
Oldsmobile Limited
Oldsmobile Series 22
Buick Model 10
Oakland

References

30
Cars introduced in 1909
1900s cars
Brass Era vehicles